Salomon Corrodi   (23 April 1810 – July 4, 1892) was a Swiss-Italian painter, mainly of watercolor landscapes.

Biography
He was born in Fehraltorf, the son of an Italian Protestant preacher living in Switzerland. Two of his sons, Hermann and Arnold, were also painters. A collection of his vedute has been published. He trained with Johann Jakob Wetzel (1781-1834), and came to Rome in 1832, along with his fellow pupil Jakob Suter (1805–1874), after visiting Genoa and Pisa. In Rome, he was influenced by the circle of Neoclassical artists around Bertel Thorvaldsen He died in Como, Italy.

Notes
Rocky Landscape (attributed to Corrodi).

References

External links

 

1810 births
1892 deaths
Swiss painters
19th-century Italian painters
Italian male painters
Swiss people of Italian descent
19th-century Italian male artists